Émilie Lefel (born 25 August 1988) is a French badminton player. In 2012, she won her first National Championships title in the women's doubles event with her partner Pi Hongyan.

Achievements

European Games 
Women's doubles

European Championships 
Women's doubles

Mediterranean Games 
Women's doubles

BWF World Tour 
The BWF World Tour, which was announced on 19 March 2017 and implemented in 2018, is a series of elite badminton tournaments sanctioned by the Badminton World Federation (BWF). The BWF World Tours are divided into levels of World Tour Finals, Super 1000, Super 750, Super 500, Super 300 (part of the HSBC World Tour), and the BWF Tour Super 100.

Women's doubles

BWF Grand Prix 
The BWF Grand Prix had two levels, the Grand Prix and Grand Prix Gold. It was a series of badminton tournaments sanctioned by the Badminton World Federation (BWF) and played between 2007 and 2017.

Mixed doubles

  BWF Grand Prix Gold tournament
  BWF Grand Prix tournament

BWF International Challenge/Series 
Women's doubles

Mixed doubles

  BWF International Challenge tournament
  BWF International Series tournament
  BWF Future Series tournament

References

External links 

1988 births
Living people
People from Lens, Pas-de-Calais
French female badminton players
Mediterranean Games silver medalists for France
Competitors at the 2013 Mediterranean Games
Sportspeople from Pas-de-Calais
Mediterranean Games medalists in badminton
Badminton players at the 2019 European Games
European Games bronze medalists for France
European Games medalists in badminton